Vaishali Kasaravalli (12 April 1952 – 27 September 2010) was a noted Kannada actress, television serial director, and costume designer.

Early life
She was born on 12 April 1952 in Gulbarga to theatre enthusiast parents Dr. Chitagopi and Nirmala. She completed a BA.

Career

Actor
She was initiated to theatre by B. V. Karanth. After her family migrated to Bangalore, Vaishali acted in many plays including Hayavadana, Jokumaraswamy, Midsummer Nights Dream, Natakakaarana Shdhaneyalli Aaru Paathragalu and many others. She also directed Sevanthi Prasanga and translated many classic works from Marathi and Hindi.

She made her film debut with Yaava Janmada Maitri followed by Professor Huchuraya in 1972. Her popular films are Akramana, Yarigu Helbedi, Kittu Puttu, Kubi Matthu Iyala, Angaialli Apsare, Kraurya, Hombisilu, Swamy, Thabarana Kathe, Ksheera Sagara, Anukolakkoba Ganda, Asegoba Meesegobba, Mooru Daarigalu, Mahadasoshi Sharana Basava, Chandramuki Pranasaki, Panjarada Gili, Hoovondhu Beku Ballige, Vigneswarana Vahana, Shanker Guru, Palitamsha, Parivarthana, Sparsha, Nigatha, Ganeshana Maduve, Gauri Ganesha, Thavarumane Udugore, No 73 Shanthinivasa, and others. Her performance as the leading lady in Aakramana directed by Girish Kasaravalli won her laurels and also a state government award for the Best actress.

Vaishali also acted in many tele-serials including Namma Nammalli, Kasa Musure Saroja, Malgudi Days, Kshamaya Daritri, Mayamruga, Manvanthara, Sadhane. Namma Nammalli directed by T. S. Nagabharana was the first of the serials she was featured in.

Movies 

1972 Yaava Janmada Maitri (Actress)
1972 Subhadra Kalyana (Actress)
1974 Professor Hucchuraya (Actress)
1974 Eradu Kanasu (Actress)
1974 Bhootayyana Maga Ayyu (Actress)
1974 Bangaarada Panjara (Actress)
1976 Phalitamsha (Actress)
1976 Parivarthane (Actress)
1977 Kittu Puttu (Actress - Gowri)
1978 Sandarbha (Dubbing Artist)
1978 Shankar Guru (Actress)
1978 Hombisilu (Actress - Doctor Vasanthi)
1978 Geejagana Goodu (Dubbing Artist)
1980 Vathsalya patha (Dubbing Artist)
1980 Akramana (Actress)
1982 Manasa Sarovara (Actress)
1983 Anveshane (Dubbing Artist)
1984 Vigneshwara Vahana (Actress)
1985 Maruthi Mahime (Actress)
1985 Mamatheya Madilu (Actress)
1986 Henne Ninagenu Bandhana (Actress)
1988 Chiranjeevi Sudhakar (Actress)
1988 Tabarana Kathe (Actress)
1988 Mahadasohi Sharana Basava (Actress)
1988 Kadina Benki (Actress)
1989 Mane (Dubbing Artist)
1989 Bangarada Baduku (Actress)
1990 Shruthi (Actress)
1990 Hosa Jeevana (Actress)
1990 Ganeshana Maduve (Actress- Satyabhama/Ganesha's Mother)
1990 Abhimanyu (Actress)
1990 Aasegobba Meesegobba (Actress)
1991 Thavarumane Udugore (Actress)
1991 Readymade Ganda (Actress)
1991 Mangalya (Actress)
1991 Kalyana Mantapa (Actress)
1991 Gowri Kalyana (Actress)
1991 Gowri Ganesha (Actress - Chandramouli\'s mother)
1992 Amara Prema (Actress)
1992 Kubi Matthu Iyala (Actress,Costume)
1992 Ksheera Sagara (Actress)
1992 Hatamari Hennu Kiladi Gandu (Actress)
1992 Goonda Rajya (Actress)
1992 Ganesha Subramanya (Actress)
1992 Belliyappa Bangarappa (Actress)
1992 Agni Panjara (Actress)
1993 Nanendu Nimmavane (Actress)
1993 Manikantana Mahime (Actress)
1993 Kadambari (Actress)
1993 Hoovondu Beku Ballige (Actress)
1993 Anuragada Alegalu (Actress)
1993 Angaiyalli Apsare (Actress)
1994 Yarigu Helbedi (Actress)
1995 Nighatha (Actress)
1995 Hosa Baduku (Actress)
1996 Sowbhagya Devathe (Actress)
1996 Hello Daddy (Actress)
1996 America America (Actress)
1996 Kraurya (Associate Director, Costume Design)
1997 Thaayi Saheba (Costume Design)
1997 Prema Raga Hadu Gelathi (Actress)
1997 Kalavida (Actress)
1999 Chandramukhi Pranasakhi (Actress)
2000 Shreerasthu Shubhamasthu (Actress)
2000 Premi (Actress)
2002 Dweepa (Costume)
2003 Panchali (Actress)
2003 Wrong Number (Actress)
2006 Savira Mettilu (Actress)
2007 No. 73, Shanthi Nivasa (Actress - Seethadevi)
2007 Nayi Neralu (Dubbing Artist)
2010 Kanasembo Kudureyaneri (Costume)

Director
She has directed popular Kannada TV serials like `Muttina Torana' and `Moodala Mane'.

Costume designer
Vaishali Kasaravalli worked as a costume designer in her husband's films such as Bannada Vesha, Mane, Kubi Mathu Iyyala, Kraurya, Thaayi Saheba (won national award in 1998), Dweepa, and Kanasemba Kudureyaneri.

Awards
Vaishali received several honors including
State award for acting (Aakramana),
National award for costume design (Thaayi Saheba),
State Best supporting actress (Palitamsha),
Natak Academy award and Rajyotsava award.

Politics
Vaishali was into politics in the late '90s. She contested for the Bangalore City Corporation elections in 1996 from the Lok Shakti party but lost. She was a staunch admirer of former chief minister Ramakrishna Hegde.

Personal life 
Vaishali was married to acclaimed film-maker Girish Kasaravalli. She had two children, Apoorva Kasaravalli and Ananya Kasaravalli

Death
She died on 27 September 2010 in Bangalore, after ailing for few years with diabetes, liver, and kidney problems. Her body was kept at Ravindra Kalakshetra for her relatives, friends, and fans to pay their final respect. She was cremated according to her family tradition at Banashankari crematorium in Bangalore.

References

External links 

1952 births
2010 deaths
20th-century Indian actresses
Actresses in Kannada cinema
Indian stage actresses
Indian television actresses
Indian women television directors
Indian television directors
Indian costume designers
Indian actor-politicians
People from Kalaburagi
Women in Karnataka politics
20th-century Indian politicians
Indian film actresses
20th-century Indian women politicians
Actresses from Karnataka
20th-century Indian designers
Actresses in Kannada theatre
Best Costume Design National Film Award winners
Recipients of the Rajyotsava Award 2005